"The Shoes" is the 56th episode of the NBC television sitcom Seinfeld. It is the 16th episode for the fourth season, and first aired on February 4, 1993. In the episode, Elaine is upset at Jerry and George dropping her character from their proposed Jerry series, which then becomes endangered when George is caught staring at the cleavage of NBC executive Russel Dalrymple's teenage daughter.

Plot
Jerry and George struggle to keep NBC interested in their show. In writing the pilot, they drop their plan to include a character based on Elaine, because they don't know how to write for a woman. Kramer tells Jerry that he encountered Gail Cunningham, who Jerry previously dated; Kramer snubbed her because she refused to kiss Jerry after three dates. Gail confronts Jerry at Monk's Café over Kramer's behavior, for which he disavows responsibility. Elaine is wearing a pair of shoes from Botticelli, and feels embarrassed when Gail makes a big deal over it.

George asks his therapist for feedback on the script. She reveals that she didn't like it, and George throws a tantrum. Kramer tells Jerry that he encountered Gail again, and ended up kissing her. Jerry is perturbed that she would willingly kiss Kramer without even going on a real date, and Kramer hypothesizes that it was the snubbing which made her so amorous. After Kramer tells Elaine that Gail told him about Elaine's shoes, she confronts Gail at the restaurant where she is a chef. Elaine, who is coming down with the flu, sneezes on a plate of pasta primavera that is then served to NBC executive Russell Dalrymple.

Jerry and George finish writing their script and meet Russell at his apartment home, but Russell runs to the bathroom when he becomes violently ill with the stomach flu. Russell's 15-year-old daughter arrives, and Russell catches George staring at the girl's cleavage; he sends them away without providing any input on the script. Jerry and George decide that the best way to assuage Russell's anger would be to demonstrate their point-of-view by arranging for him to stare at Elaine's cleavage. Gail agrees to inform Jerry when Russell dines at her restaurant again, on the condition that Elaine give her the Botticelli shoes. Elaine wears a low-cut dress to the restaurant and Russell stares at her cleavage; he acknowledges to Jerry and George that a man will stare at cleavage that enters his field of vision.

Jerry, George, and Elaine eat at the restaurant. Elaine agrees to go on a date with Russell. She persuades Jerry and George to write her into the 'Jerry' scripts. When she suggests a scenario where the butler is distracted by her cleavage, the others decry this type of humor as "too broad" for their show, but soon relent.

Production
This was the first episode of season 4 in which Seinfeld was moved from its Wednesday time slot to Thursday at 9:30, right after Cheers, which was in its last season. Seinfeld would take over Cheers spot the following fall and remain there for the rest of the series. The four main characters apprised their viewers of this change in a short segment that ran during the Super Bowl. It was revealed in the DVD "Inside Look" that many on the show were worried that people would be viewing Seinfeld for the first time in this new spot and therefore would know nothing about the story arc of Jerry and George's NBC pilot. The show's popularity skyrocketed through the rest of the season, however, starting its successful run. As David Sims wrote at The A.V. Club, "The whole thing was promoted during the Super Bowl and was the start of Seinfeld moving from semi-popular critical hit to world-invading zeitgeist water-cooler explosion."

Critical reception 

Reviewer David Sims gave the episode an A, saying, "Every cast member gets some really fun material to play with and the plots spiral together marvelously... This plot is a great dissection of male honor, or the bro code, or whatever you want to call it. ... Seinfeld episodes like this are almost like heist movies—it's just great watching a plot come together." Aaron George of Place2BeNation, giving a grade of 7 out of 10, said, "I continue to really enjoy all the 'writing' scenes. They truly capture the essence of the excitement of finding hilarity in the most mundane lines that you write." On the other hand, "It's starting to stretch the believability a bit that Jerry is continuing to write this pilot with George. He's brought nothing but strife since to the project from day one."

References

External links 
 

Seinfeld (season 4) episodes
1993 American television episodes
Television episodes written by Larry David
Television episodes written by Jerry Seinfeld